Tom Eymard Reid (3 March 1926 – 12 November 1996) was a rugby union player from Limerick, Ireland who played in the lock position. O'Connor played club rugby with Garryowen and London Irish, was capped thirteen times for Ireland, and was a member of the British and Irish Lions team that toured in 1955.

Personal life

Tom Reid was born on 3 March 1926 in Limerick, Ireland. His father, Joe Reid had also played rugby for Garryowen and his cousin was the Irish international Paddy Reid. Reid attended the Christian Boys' College in Limerick. As well as playing rugby, Reid also rowed for Limerick Boat Club.

Rugby career

Reid first appearance for the Garryowen club came in the 1947-48 season. With Garryowen, he won the Munster Senior Cup on three occasions, including 1954 when he was the club captain. He played for the Munster representative team in matches against international opposition; against Australia in 1947, South Africa in 1951 and New Zealand in 1954. He later played for London Irish.

His first appearance for Ireland was in the 1953 Five Nations Championship, against England.  In January 1954 against New Zealand, he moved from his usual position at lock to play at Number 8. He returned to lock for subsequent appearances in the 1954 and 1955 Five Nations Championship matches.

Reid was included in the squad for the British Lions tour to South Africa in 1955. During the tour, Reid played in ten tour games against local opposition and two out of the four test matches against the South Africa national team; the second test where he played at Number 8 position and the third test where he reverted to his usual position at lock.

In December 1955, Reid played at Flanker in a combined Scotland & Ireland team that played a combined England & Wales team at Lansdowne Road to mark the opening of the West Upper Stand at the venue. Further appearances for Ireland followed in the 1956 Five Nations and the 1957 Five Nations, the only edition of the championship where Reid played in all four of Ireland's games. His 13th and final game for Ireland came in that championship, against Wales.

Reid also played 14 games for the Barbarians invitational team, including six games on the team's first overseas tour to Canada in 1957. Reid decided to emigrate to Canada following the tour. In 1959 Reid played for the Eastern Canada team in their match against the British Lions. As of 2017 (note as well as Ricki Flutey (NZ Maori 2005 v Lions, and played for the lions in 2009), James Hook also played for and against the Lions (Lions 2009, baabaas 2013), and Jarred Payne and Elliot Daly both played for the baabaas against the lions in 2013 and subsequently played for the lions on tour in 2017.  Multiple Lions also played for the BaaBaas in 1977, and tbc whether any of the Welsh XV who played the Lions in 1955 had previously played for, or subsequently went on to play for, the Lions), he is one of only two players to have played both for and against the Lions.

References

Irish rugby union players
Ireland international rugby union players
Munster Rugby players
Garryowen Football Club players
1926 births
1996 deaths
Rugby union players from Limerick (city)
British & Irish Lions rugby union players from Ireland
Barbarian F.C. players
Rugby union locks
Irish emigrants to Canada